The Ceaseless Sight is the third solo album from Black Crowes guitarist Rich Robinson.

Track listing

Personnel 
 Rich Robinson – guitars, vocals
 Joe Magistro – drums
 Marco Benevento – keyboards
 Amy Helm – Vocals on "The Giving Key" and "One Road Hill"
 Katrine Ottosen – Vocals on "This Unfortunate Show"
 Steve Molitz – Keyboard on "Down the Road"

Production
 Produced by Rich Robinson
 Engineered by Chris Bittner
 Mixed by Chris Bittner and Mike Birnbaum
 Master by Chris Athens

References

2014 albums
Rich Robinson albums
The End Records albums